The golden-crested myna (Ampeliceps coronatus) is a species in the starling and myna family, Sturnidae. It is found from north-eastern India through Indochina and has been introduced to the British Indian Ocean Territory. Its main habitat is subtropical or tropical moist lowland forest, but it is also found in heavily degraded former forest.

References

External links
 
 

golden-crested myna
Birds of Southeast Asia
golden-crested myna
golden-crested myna